Sabaskong Bay 35F is a First Nations reserve on Lake of the Woods, straddling the border of Kenora District and Rainy River District in Ontario. It is one of the reserves of the Ojibways of Onigaming First Nation.

References

External links
 Canada Lands Survey System

Saulteaux reserves in Ontario
Communities in Kenora District
Communities in Rainy River District